Gianina Maria Sta. Maria Abrahan-Perz (born November 6, 1985), also known as Gee-Ann Abrahan, is a Filipino actress and former reality show contestant. She came to prominence from her stint in the second season of Pinoy Big Brother, hailed as the fourth Big Placer, placing behind Wendy Valdez, Mickey Perz and season winner Beatriz Saw.

Early life
Abrahan was born in Quezon City, Philippines. An alumna of Assumption College in San Lorenzo, Makati, she was part of the school's cheerleading team. She is a collector of voodoo dolls and stuffed toys since the age of six. During her stay in the Pinoy Big Brother House, she brought along the doll she owned the longest, a baby doll called Pamela which had been in her possession for 15 years. On Day 63 of the reality show, she gave Pamela away to an orphaned girl as part of a sacrifice and letting go.

Career
After her Pinoy Big Brother stint, Gee-Ann was cast in a lead role for the romance-fantasy series Love Spell in a multi-episodic story entitled Bumalaka, Bulalakaw, Boom alongside her PBB crushes Bodie Cruz and Mickey Perz. Abrahan became a guest cast of various ABS-CBN television series, including the second installment of the Sineserye Presents: The Susan Roces Cinema Collection, Maligno alongside Kim Chiu and Claudine Barretto. In 2009, she was cast as Tammy Bernal in a supporting role in Habang May Buhay, with the comeback of the Judy Ann Santos-Gladys Reyes tandem.  Currently, she is a Viva artist.

Personal life
Abrahan is married to fellow-PBB Season 2 ex-housemate Mickey Perz, with whom she's been in a relationship for seven years, and had two children together.

Filmography

Films

See also
Pinoy Big Brother: Season 2
ABS-CBN
Star Magic
Viva Entertainment

External links

References

1985 births
Living people
Filipino child singers
Filipino film actresses
Filipino television actresses
21st-century Filipino actresses
Pinoy Big Brother contestants
Star Magic personalities
21st-century Filipino women singers